Rozina Tufail is a Pakistani politician who had been a member of the National Assembly of Pakistan, from 2002 to 2007.

References

Pakistani MNAs 2002–2007
Women members of the National Assembly of Pakistan
Living people
Year of birth missing (living people)
21st-century Pakistani women politicians